{{Infobox Former Country
| native_name            = 
| conventional_long_name = German Empire
| common_name            = German Empire
| era                    = Concert of Europe
| status                 = Failed to establish
| status_text            = Quasi-state
| year_start             = 1848
| year_end               = 1849
| event_start            = German Revolution of 1848
| date_start             = 
| event1                 = Frankfurt Constitution
| date_event1            = 28 March 1849
| event_end              = Frankfurt National Assembly dissolved
| date_end               = 31 May
| date_post              = 1850
| event_post             = German Confederation restored
| p1                     = German Confederation
| flag_p1                = Wappen Deutscher Bund.svg
| border_p1              = no
| s1                     = German Confederation
| flag_s1                = Wappen Deutscher Bund.svg
| border_s1              = no
| currency               = 
| image_flag             = Flag of Germany.svg
| flag_type              = Flag
| flag_type_article      = Flag of Germany
| image_coat             = Imperial Coat of arms of Germany (1848).svg
| symbol_type            = Coat of arms
| symbol_type_article    = Coat of arms of Germany
| image_map              = German Empire (1849).png
| image_map_caption      = The German Empire's controlled territories and its claims

| capital                = Frankfurt
| government_type        = Confederal parliamentary constitutional monarchy under a regency
| title_leader           = Emperor of the Germans-elect
| leader1                = Frederick William IV| year_leader1           = 1849
| title_representative   = Imperial Regent
| representative1        = Archduke John
| year_representative1   = 1848-1849
| title_deputy           = Prime Minister
| deputy1                = Karl
| year_deputy1           = 1848 (first)
| deputy2                = August Ludwig zu Sayn-Wittgenstein-Berleburg
| year_deputy2           = 1849 (last)
| legislature            = Frankfurt National Assembly
| footnotes              = 1: Frederick William IV was offered the imperial crown, but refused to "pick up a crown from the gutter".
| demonym                = German
}}

The German Empire was a failed attempt to unify the German states within the German Confederation to create a German nation-state. It was created in the spring of 1848 during the German revolutions by the Frankfurt National Assembly. The parliament elected Archduke John of Austria as its provisional head of state with the title ‘Imperial Regent’. On 28 March 1849, its constitution was implemented and the parliament elected the king of Prussia, Frederick William IV, to be the constitutional monarch of the empire with the title ‘Emperor of the Germans’. However, he turned the position down. The empire came to an end in December 1849 when the Central German Government was replaced by a Federal Central Commission.

The German National Assembly (Frankfurt Parliament) considered itself as the parliament of a new empire and enacted imperial laws. It installed a provisional government and created the first fleet of all Germany. In May 1849, larger German states such as Austria and Prussia forced members of parliament to resign. The provisional government lasted until December of that year. In summer 1851, the reinstalled Bundestag of the German Confederation declared the imperial legislation to be void. However, the German Bundestag and the states never called the provisional government illegal.

During its existence, several foreign countries recognized the empire, such as the Netherlands, Switzerland and the USA. The legacy of the empire consists e.g., in the experience of general all-German elections in 1848, the constitution of 1849. The modern German navy celebrates June 14th as its anniversary because of the 1848 parliament decision to create a fleet. The flag adopted by the empire by law in November 1848, is the flag of modern Germany (black-red-gold).

History
The state was created by the Frankfurt Parliament in spring 1848, following the March Revolution. The empire ended in December 1849 when the Central German Government was replaced with a Federal Central Commission.

The Empire struggled to be recognized by both German and foreign states. The German states, represented by the Federal Convention of the German Confederation, on 12 July 1848, acknowledged the Central German Government. In the following months, however, the larger German states did not always accept the decrees and laws of the Central German Government and the Frankfurt Parliament.

Several foreign states recognized the Central Government and sent ambassadors: the United States, Sweden, the Netherlands, Belgium, Switzerland, Sardinia, Sicily, and Greece. The French Second Republic and the United Kingdom of Great Britain and Ireland installed official envoys to keep contact with the Central Government.

The first constitutional order of the German Empire was the Imperial Law concerning the introduction of a provisional Central Power for Germany, on 28 June 1848. With the order, the Frankfurt Parliament established the offices of Reichsverweser (Imperial Regent, a provisional monarch) and imperial ministers. A second constitutional order, the Frankfurt Constitution, on 28 March 1849, was accepted by 28 German states but not by the larger ones. Prussia, along with other German states, forced the Frankfurt Parliament into dissolution.

Several of this German Empire's accomplishments outlasted it: the Frankfurt Constitution was used as a model in other states in the decades to follow and the electoral law was used nearly verbatim in 1867 for the election of the Reichstag of the North German Confederation. The  (Imperial Fleet) created by the Frankfurt Parliament lasted until 1852. The imperial law issuing a decree concerning bills of exchange (General German exchange bills) was considered to apply to nearly all of Germany.

 Continuity and status 

Contemporaries and scholars had different opinions about the statehood of the German Empire of 1848/1849:
 One group followed a positivist point of view: law was statutory law. A constitution for Germany had to be agreed upon with the governments of all German states. This was the opinion of the monarchists and the German states.
 The other group valued natural law and the principle of the sovereignty of the people higher; the National Assembly alone had the power to establish a constitution. This was the opinion of the majority of the Frankfurt Parliament, but especially the republican left.
In reality the distinction was less clear. The majority of the Frankfurt Parliament, based on the liberal groups, wanted to establish a dualist system with a sovereign monarch whose powers would be constrained by a constitution and parliament.

A German Confederation was created in 1815. This treaty organization for the defense of the German territories lacked, in the view of the national movement, a government and a parliament. But it was generally acknowledged by German and foreign powers – to establish a national state, it was the easiest to present it as the continuation of the Confederation. This was actually the road the National Assembly took, although it originally saw itself as a revolutionary organ.

The continuity between the old Confederation and the new organs was based on two decisions of the Confederation's Federal Convention:
 The Federal Convention (representing the German states' governments) called for elections of the Frankfurt Parliament in April/May 1848.
 The German states immediately acknowledged Archduke John, the provisional head of state elected by the Frankfurt Parliament. On 12 July 1848, the Federal Convention ended its activities in favor of the Imperial Regent, Archduke John. This was an implicit recognition of the Law concerning the Central Power of 28 June.
Of course, the German states and the Federal Convention made those decisions under pressure of the revolution. They wanted to avoid a breakup with the Frankfurt Parliament. (Already in August this pressure faltered, and the larger states started to regain power.) According to historian Ernst Rudolf Huber, it was possible to determine a continuity or even legal identity of Confederation and the new Federal State. The old institution was enhanced with a (provisional) constitutional order and the name German Confederation was changed to German Empire. Ulrich Huber notes that none of the German states declared the Imperial Regent John and his government to be usurpatory or illegal.

 State power, territory and people 

The Frankfurt Assembly saw itself as the German national legislature, as made explicit in the Imperial Law concerning the declaration of the imperial laws and the decrees of the provisional Central Power, from 27 September 1848. It issued laws earlier, such as the law of 14 June that created the Imperial Fleet. Maybe the most notable law declared the highly acclaimed Basic Rights of the German People, 27 December 1848.

The Central Power or Central Government consisted of the Imperial Regent, Archduke John, and the ministers he appointed. He usually appointed those politicians that had the support of the Frankfurt Parliament, at least until May 1849. One of the ministers, the Prussian general Eduard von Peucker, was charged with the federal troops and federal fortifications of the German Confederation. The Central Government had not much to govern, as the administration remained in the hands of the single states. But in February 1849, 105 people worked for the Central Government (in comparison to the 10 for the Federal Convention).

The Frankfurt Parliament assumed in general that the territory of the German Confederation was also the territory of the new state. Someone was a German if he was a subject of one of the German states within the German Empire (§ 131, Frankfurt Constitution). Additionally, it discussed the future of other territories where Germans lived. The members of parliament sometimes referred to the German language spoken in a territory, sometimes to historical rights, sometimes to military considerations (e.g., when a Polish state was rejected because it would be too weak to serve as a buffer state against Russia). One of the most disputed territories was Schleswig.

References

Further reading
Ralf Heikaus: Die ersten Monate der provisorischen Zentralgewalt für Deutschland (Juli bis Dezember 1848).'' PhD thesis. Peter Lang, Frankfurt am Main [u. a.] 1997, 

1848 establishments in Germany
1849 disestablishments in Germany
Former unrecognized countries
Frankfurt Parliament
German revolutions of 1848–1849
Legal history of Germany
Pan-Germanism
States and territories disestablished in 1849
States and territories established in 1848